Rahile Dawut (Chinese: 热依拉·达吾提; pinyin: Rèyīlā Dáwútí; Uyghur: راھىلە داۋۇت; b. 1966) was a professor at Xinjiang University in China’s Xinjiang Uyghur Autonomous Region and is internationally recognized as an expert in Uyghur folklore and traditions. She has received awards and grants from China’s Ministry of Culture, and is the founder of a folklore institute. She is suspected of being held by state authorities at an undisclosed location. She was disappeared by the Chinese government in 2017 and has not been seen since.

Early life and career
She has been a member of the Chinese Communist Party for more than 30 years. She taught at Xinjiang University prior to her detention. At Xinjiang University she founded the Minorities Folklore Research Center and served as its director. She has published a number of significant articles and books.

Disappearance
In December 2017, Professor Rahile reportedly told a relative of her plans to travel from Ürümqi to Beijing. Since that time, however, her family and friends have lost contact with her. Professor Dawut’s family and friends announced her disappearance in August 2018. By 2018, it was known that she was in the hands of Chinese state authorities. 
State authorities have not publicly disclosed Professor Rahile’s whereabouts or details of her well-being, access to legal counsel, or any charges against her. Professor Rahile’s family, along with human rights groups, suspects that she is among a growing number of Uyghurs who have been reportedly taken into custody by authorities and are being held at so-called “re-education camps,” in prisons, or at other detention facilities.

According to an article in the New York Times, she was one of a number of prominent intellectuals targeted as part of China's campaign to erase Uyghur identity.

Award in 2020
Rahile received the Courage to Think award for the year 2020 by Scholars at Risk. Rahile's daughter Akida Pulat received the award on her mother's behalf.

See also
Ilham Tohti
List of people who disappeared
Tashpolat Tiyip

References

Chinese anthropologists
Chinese prisoners and detainees
Educators from Xinjiang
Missing people
Missing person cases in China
Academic staff of Xinjiang University
1966 births
Enforced disappearances in China